The Campeonato Pernambucano Série A2 is the second level of football tournaments for the Pernambucano state clubs that don't play in the Campeonato Pernambucano First Division. The competitions are organized by the Pernambucan Football Federation. Usually, the champions of a division are promoted in the next year to the immediately upper level.

Competition format
The 2022 Série A2 was disputed by 25 clubs. The tournament was played on a single round-robin basis.

In the first stage, the clubs were divided into four groups. The top four teams of each group advanced to the second stage.
In the second stage, the sixteen qualified clubs were divided into four groups. The top two teams of each group advanced to the third stage.
In the third stage, the eight qualified clubs were divided into two groups. The top two teams advanced to the semi-finals.
Originally, the four semi-finalists were promoted to 2023 Série A but finally five teams were promoted.

2022 Série A2
1º de Maio 
América 
Atlético Pernambucano 
Atlético Torres 
Belo Jardim 
Cabense 
Central (XXX – Promoted)
Centro Limoeirense 
Chã Grande 
Decisão 
Ferroviário do Cabo 
Flamengo de Arcoverde 
Ipojuca 
Jaguar 
Maguary (XXX – Promoted)
Pesqueira 
Petrolina (XXX – Promoted)
Porto (XXX – Promoted)
Santa Fé 
Serrano 
Sete de Setembro 
Timbaúba 
Vera Cruz 
Vitória das Tabocas 
Ypiranga

List of Champions

Titles by team 

Teams in bold still active.

By city

See also
Campeonato Pernambucano
Campeonato Pernambucano Série A3

References

 Campeonato Pernambucano Second Level at RSSSF
 Campeonato Pernambucano Third Level at RSSSF

External links
 Pernambuco Football Federation official website